Aubstadt is a municipality in the district of Rhön-Grabfeld in Bavaria in Germany.

Sport
The town's association football club TSV Aubstadt, formed in 1921, experienced its greatest success in 2019 when it won promotion to tier-four Regionalliga Bayern for the first time.

References

Rhön-Grabfeld
Bibra family